François Corriveau (born November 7, 1969) is a politician in Quebec, Canada, and was the Action démocratique du Québec (ADQ) Member of the National Assembly for the electoral district of Saguenay (now known as René-Lévesque), in the Côte-Nord region, from 2002 to 2003.

Background

He was born in Baie-Comeau and is the son of a judge. He graduated from the Université Laval in 1992 with a B.A. in Law and was admitted to the Bar of Quebec in 1993. He served as Baie-Comeau's deputy clerk from 1994 to 2002 and from 2003 to 2008.

Member of the Provincial Legislature

Corriveau was first elected to the National Assembly in a by-election held on April 15, 2002 with 48% of the vote. Liberal candidate Isabelle Melançon finished second with 28% of the vote.

Corriveau was only the second ADQ member ever to be elected to the National Assembly. His victory surprised most observers and temporarily boosted the ADQ's exposure in the media.

In the 2003 election, Corriveau finished second with 33% of the vote, behind Parti Québécois (PQ) candidate Marjolain Dufour (41%).

Federal politics

In December 2006, Corriveau clinched the Conservative nomination for a seat in the riding of Manicouagan in the 2008 federal election.  However he declared in August 2008 that he renounced his candidacy in order to become clerk of the city of Baie-Comeau. He is still in good terms with the Conservative Party.  Corriveau's replacement as Manicouagan's Conservative nominee was pharmacist Pierre Breton.

Corriveau was named the Conservative candidate for the riding of Manicouagan again for the 2019 federal election, finishing third.

Electoral record

Federal

Provincial

Footnotes

External links
 

1969 births
Action démocratique du Québec MNAs
Conservative Party of Canada candidates for the Canadian House of Commons
Living people
People from Baie-Comeau
Université Laval alumni